A natural arch, natural bridge, or (less commonly) rock arch is a natural landform where an arch has formed with an opening underneath. Natural arches commonly form where inland cliffs, coastal cliffs, fins or stacks are subject to erosion from the sea, rivers or weathering (subaerial processes).

Most natural arches are formed from narrow fins and sea stacks composed of sandstone or limestone with steep, often vertical, cliff faces. The formations become narrower due to erosion over geologic time scales. The softer rock stratum erodes away creating rock shelters, or alcoves, on opposite sides of the formation beneath the relatively harder stratum, or caprock, above it. The alcoves erode further into the formation eventually meeting underneath the harder caprock layer, thus creating an arch. The erosional processes exploit weaknesses in the softer rock layers making cracks larger and removing material more quickly than the caprock; however, the caprock itself continues to erode after an arch has formed, which will ultimately lead to collapse.

The choice between bridge and arch is somewhat arbitrary. The Natural Arch and Bridge Society identifies a bridge as a subtype of arch that is primarily water-formed. By contrast, the Dictionary of Geological Terms defines a natural bridge as a "natural arch that spans a valley of erosion."

Coastline

On coasts two different types of arches can form depending on the geology. On discordant coastlines rock types run at 90° to the coast. Wave refraction concentrates the wave energy on the headland, and an arch forms when caves break through the headland. Two examples of this type of arch are London Archpreviously known as London Bridgein Victoria, Australia, and Neill Island in the Andaman Islands, India. When these arches eventually collapse, they form stacks and stumps. On concordant coastlines rock types run parallel to the coastline, with weak rock such as shale protected by stronger rock such as limestone. The wave action along concordant coastlines breaks through the strong rock and then erodes the weak rock very quickly. Good examples of this type of arch are the Durdle Door and Stair Hole near Lulworth Cove on Dorset's Jurassic Coast in south England. When Stair Hole eventually collapses it will form a cove.

Weather-eroded arches

Weather-eroded arches begin their formation as deep cracks which penetrate into a sandstone layer. Erosion occurring within the cracks wears away exposed rock layers and enlarges the surface cracks isolating narrow sandstone walls which are called fins. Alternating frosts and thawing cause crumbling and flaking of the porous sandstone and eventually cut through some of the fins. The resulting holes become enlarged to arch proportions by rockfalls and weathering. The arches eventually collapse leaving only buttresses that in time will erode.

Many weather-eroded arches are found in Arches National Park, Canyonlands National Park, and Grand Staircase–Escalante National Monument (GSENM), all located in southern Utah, United States.

Water-eroded arches

Some natural bridges may look like arches, but they form in the path of streams that wear away and penetrate the rock. Pothole arches form by chemical weathering as water collects in natural depressions and eventually cuts through to the layer below.

Cave erosion
Natural bridges can form from natural limestone caves, where paired sinkholes collapse and a ridge of stone is left standing in between, with the cave passageway connecting from sinkhole to sinkhole.

Like all rock formations, natural bridges are subject to continued erosion, and will eventually collapse and disappear.  One example of this was the double-arched Victorian coastal rock formation, London Bridge, which lost an arch after storms increased erosion.

Moon Hill in Yangshuo, Guizhou Province, China, is an example of an arch formed by the remnant of a karst limestone cave.

Arches as highway or railway bridges

In a few places in the world, natural arches are utilized by humans as transportation bridges with highways or railroads running across them.

In Virginia, US Route 11 traverses Natural Bridge. Two additional natural arch roadways are found in Kentucky. The first, a cave erosion arch made of limestone, is in Carter Caves State Resort Park and has a paved road on top. The second, a weather-eroded sandstone arch with a dirt road on top, is on the edge of Natural Bridge State Park in Kentucky. The latter arch is called White's Branch Arch (also known as the Narrows) and the road going over it is usually referred to as the Narrows Road.

The railroad from Lima, Peru crosses the Rio Yauli on a natural bridge near kilometer 214.2 as it approaches the city of La Oroya.

Notable natural arches

Africa

 Aloba Arch, Chad
 Boatswain Bird Island, Ascension Island
 Bogenfels, Namibia
 Goedehoop natural rock bridge, South Africa
 Hole-in-the-Wall, Eastern Cape, South Africa
 Tassili n'Ajjer and Tadrart Rouge, two mountain ranges with many arches, Algeria
 Tukuyu natural bridge, Tanzania
 Wolfberg Arch, Cederberg, Western Cape, South Africa

Antarctica
 The Kerguelen Arch, Christmas Harbour, the Kerguelen Islands (collapsed ca. 1910)
 Scott Island in the Antarctic has a natural arch

Asia

 Arch Cave, Galilee, Israel
 Burdah Bridge, Wadi Rum, Jordan
 Baatara gorge waterfall in Tannourine, Lebanon has three natural bridges. 
 Engetsu Island, Shirahama, Wakayama, Japan
 Hawrah Natural Bridge, Neill Island, Andaman Islands, India
 Hazarchishma Natural Bridge, Bamyan Province, Afghanistan
 Jabal Umm Fruth Bridge, Jordan
 Jebel Kharaz, Wadi Rum, Jordan
 "Jisr al-Hajar" or the "Stone Bridge" in Mzaar Kfardebian, Lebanon
 Elephant Trunk Hill, Guilin, Guangxi province, China
 Moon Hill, Guangxi province, China
 Natural Arch, Tirumala hills, Tirumala, India
 The Pigeons' Rock known as Raouché in Beirut, Lebanon
 Punarjani Guha, natural tunnel in Thrissur district of Kerala, India
 Rock Bridge of Gulanchwadi, Narayangaon, Maharashtra, India
 Shipton's Arch, Xinjiang, China
 Steller's Arch on Bering Island, Russia
 Tianmen Mountain, Zhangjiajie, China
 Xianren Bridge, China
 The Great White Hole of Krabi, Krabi, Thailand
 Mountain Angel Eye, Cao Bằng, Vietnam

Europe

 Albandeira Arch, Lagoa, Algarve, Portugal
 Arco Naturale, Capri, Italy
 As Catedrais beach, Ribadeo, Spain
 Azure Window, Gozo, Malta (collapsed in 2017)
 Blue Window or the Seal cave of the Corinthian Gulf, in the front of the Alcyonides islands, Greece
 Bow Fiddle Rock, Portknockie, Scotland
 Chaos de Montpellier-le-Vieux, France
 Drangarnir, Faroe Islands
 Durdle Door, Dorset, England
 Dyrhólaey, Iceland
 Els Arcs, Castell de Castells, Spain 
 Es Pontàs, Spain
 Étretat, France
 Geropotamos bridge, Crete, Greece
 Għar Qawqla, Gozo, Malta (collapsed in the 20th century)
 Green Bridge of Wales, Pembrokeshire, Wales
 Hajdučka vrata, Čvrsnica mountain, Bosnia and Herzegovina
 Inland Sea, Gozo, Malta
 Kuhstall, Germany
 Lalaria beach arch, Skiathos Island, Greece
 Malá Pravčická brána, Czech Republic
 Marinha Beach, Caramujeira, Lagoa, Algarve, Portugal
 Marsden Rock, South Shields, England (collapsed in 1996)
 Marvelous Bridges, Bulgaria
 Monte Forato, Tuscany, Italy
 Ófærufoss, Iceland (collapsed in winter 1992/1993)
 Pistyll Rhaeadr, Wales
 Ponoarele, Romania (Podul lui Dumnezeu, or God's Bridge)
 Pont d'Arc, France
 Pravčická brána, Czech Republic
 Puentedey, Spain (Puentedei, or God's Bridge)
 Trypitòs Arch of Paxi Island, Greece
 Wied il-Mielaħ Window, Gozo, Malta

North America

Canada

 Percé Rock, Quebec

Caribbean
 Natural Bridge, Aruba (collapsed 2005)

Mexico

 El Arco de Cabo San Lucas, Baja California Sur

United States

 Anacapa Island, Channel Islands National Park, California
 Angel Arch, Utah
 Arch Creek, Florida
 Arch Rock, Michigan
 Ayres Natural Bridge Park, Wyoming
 Bell Smith Springs, Illinois
 Blackwater Natural Bridge, Wyoming
 Bryce Canyon National Park, Utah
 Corona Arch, Utah
 Creelsboro Natural Bridge, Kentucky
 Delicate Arch, Utah
 Druid Arch, Utah
 Eye of the Needle, Montana
 Goat Rock Beach, California
 Grosvenor Arch, Utah
 Holei Sea Arch, Hawaii Volcanoes National Park, Hawaii
 Honopū Arch, Hawaii
 Koger Arch, Kentucky
 Kolob Arch, Zion National Park, Utah
 Landscape Arch, Utah
 La Ventana Arch, El Malpais National Monument, New Mexico 
 Mesa Arch, Utah
 Natural Arch, Kentucky
 Natural Bridge, Virginia
 Natural Bridge Caverns, Texas
Natural Bridge of Arkansas
 Natural Bridge Park, Alabama
 Natural Bridge State Park, Kentucky
 Natural Bridge State Park, Massachusetts
 Natural Bridge State Park, Wisconsin
 Natural Bridges National Monument, Utah
 Natural Bridges State Beach, California
 Rainbow Bridge National Monument, Utah
 Rattlesnake Canyon, Colorado
 Rialto Beach, Olympic National Park, Washington
 Rock Bridge Memorial State Park, Missouri
 Rockbridge State Nature Preserve, Ohio
 Sewanee Natural Bridge, Tennessee
 Sipapu Bridge, Utah
 An arch at Tettegouche State Park, Minnesota, collapsed in 2010.
 Three Arch Rocks National Wildlife Refuge, Oregon
 Tonto Natural Bridge, Arizona
 Twin Arches, Big South Fork National River and Recreation Area, Tennessee
 Window Rock, Arizona
 Wrather Arch, Arizona
 Yahoo Arch, Kentucky

Oceania

Australia
 London Arch, Port Campbell National Park, Victoria, Australia (one of the two spans collapsed in 1990)
 Natural Bridge, Springbrook National Park, Queensland, Australia
 Nature's Window, Kalbarri National Park. Western Australia, Australia

New Zealand
 Mangapohue Natural Bridge, New Zealand
 Oparara Basin Arches, New Zealand
 "The Hole in the Rock", Piercy Island, Cape Brett, New Zealand
 Tunnel Beach arch, Dunedin, New Zealand

South America
 Arch Islands, Falkland Islands
 Darwin's Arch, Galápagos Islands, Ecuador (collapsed in 2021)
 Icononzo, Colombia
 La Portada, Chile
 Pedra Furada, Ceará, Brazil
 Pedra Furada, Piauí, Brazil
 Pedra Furada, Santa Catarina, Brazil
 Puente del Inca, Argentina
 Sete Cidades National Park, Brazil
 San Rafael Falls, Ecuador (formed in 2020, collapsed in 2021)

See also
List of longest natural arches

References

External links

The Natural Arch and Bridge Society

World map of many natural arches

 
Coastal and oceanic landforms
Coastal geography
Erosion landforms